This is a list of wars involving the People's Democratic Republic of Algeria and it's predecessor states.

Zayyanid Kingdom

Beylerbeylik, Pashalik, and Aghaliks of Algiers (1515-1671)

Deylikal period (1671-1830)

French conquest of Algeria and French Algeria

Modern Algeria

See also
 Foreign relations of Algeria
 History of Algeria
 Politics of Algeria
 Insurgency in the Maghreb (2002–present)

Notes

References

 
Algeria
Wars